This is a list of law enforcement agencies in the state of Pennsylvania.

Pennsylvania says it has more police departments than any other state in the country. According to the US Bureau of Justice Statistics' 2008 Census of State and Local Law Enforcement Agencies, the state had 1,117 law enforcement agencies employing 27,413 sworn police officers, about 218 for each 100,000 residents.

State Law Enforcement 
 Pennsylvania State Constable
 Pennsylvania Board of Probation and Parole
 Pennsylvania Bureau of Dog Law Enforcement
 Pennsylvania Capitol Police
 Pennsylvania State Park/Forest Rangers
 Pennsylvania Waterways Conservation Officer
 Pennsylvania Game Warden
 Pennsylvania Department of Corrections
 Pennsylvania Attorney General
 Pennsylvania State Police
 Pennsylvania Inspector General

County agencies 

Adams County Detectives. Detectives assigned to the Adams County District Attorney, Gettysburg, PA 
Adams County Sheriff's Office
Allegheny County District Attorney’s Office 
  Allegheny County Police Department
 Allegheny County Sheriff's Office
 Armstrong County Sheriff's Office
 Beaver County Sheriff's Office
 Bedford County Sheriff's Office
 Berks County Sheriff's Office
 Berks County Park Rangers 
 Blair County Sheriff’s Office 
 Bucks County Sheriff's Office
 Bucks County Park Rangers
 Butler County Sheriff's Office
 Chester County Sheriff's Office 
 Clearfield County Sheriff's Office
 Clinton County Sheriff's Office
 Columbia County Sheriff's Office
 Cumberland County Sheriff's Office
 Dauphin County Sheriff's Office
 Dauphin County District Attorney's Investigation Office 
 Delaware County Bureau of Park Police & Fire Safety
 Delaware County Sheriff's Office
 Delaware County Criminal Investigation Division 
 Elk County Sheriff's Office
 Erie County Sheriff's Office
 Fayette County Sheriff's Office 
 Forest County Sheriff's Office
 Franklin County Sheriff's Office
 Fulton County Sheriff's Office
 Greene County Sheriff's Office
 Huntingdon County Sheriff's Office
 Indiana County Sheriff's Office
 Jefferson County Sheriff's Office
 Juniata County Sheriff's Office 
 Lackawanna County Sheriff's Department
 Lancaster County Sheriff's Office 

 Lancaster County Park Rangers
 Lawrence County Sheriff's Office 
 Lebanon County Sheriff's Office 
 Lehigh County Sheriff's Office 
 Luzerne County Sheriff's Department 
 Lycoming County Sheriff's Office 
 McKean County Sheriff's Office 
 Mercer County Sheriff's Office
 Mifflin County Sheriff's Office
 Monroe County District Attorney's Office - Detective Unit
 Monroe County Sheriff's Office
 Montgomery County Sheriff's Department
 Montour County Sheriff's Office
 Northampton County Sheriff's Office
 Northumberland County Sheriff's Office
 Perry County Sheriff's Office
 Philadelphia Adult Probation and Parole Department
 Philadelphia County Sheriff's Office
 Pike County Sheriff's Office
 Potter County Sheriff's Office
 Schuylkill County Sheriff's Office
 Snyder County Sheriff's Office 
 Somerset County Sheriff's Department 
 Sullivan County Sheriff's Office 
 Susquehanna County Sheriff's Office
 Tioga County Sheriff's Office
 Union County Sheriff's Office 
 Venango County Sheriff's Office 
 Warren County Sheriff's Office 
 Washington County Sheriff's Office
 Wayne County Sheriff's Office
 Westmoreland County Sheriff's Office
 Westmoreland County Park Police
 Wyoming County Sheriff's Office
 York County Sheriff's Office 
 York County Park Rangers

Municipal agencies 

 Abbottstown Borough Police Department
 Abington Township Police Department
 Adams Township Police Department
 Alburtis Borough Police Department
 Aldan Borough Police Department
 Allegheny Township Police Department
 Allentown Police Department
 Aliquippa City Police Department
 Altoona Police Department
 Ambridge Borough Police Department
 Amity Township Police Department
 Apollo Borough Police Department
 Archbald Borough Police Department
 City of Arnold Police Department
 Ashley Borough Police Department
 Ashland Borough Police Department
 Aspinwall Borough Police Department
 Aston Township Police Department
 Athens Township Police Department
 Auburn Police Department
 Avalon Borough Police Department
 Avoca Borough Police Department
 Avonmore Borough Police Department
 Baden Police Department 
 Baldwin Borough Police Department
 Bally Borough Police Department
 Bangor Borough Police Department
 Barnesboro Police Department
 Bear Creek Township/Bear Creek Village Police Department
 Barrett Township Police Department
 Beaver Falls Police Department 
 Bedminster Township Police
 Bell Acres Police Department
 Bellefonte Police Department
 Bellwood Police Department
 Ben Avon Heights Police Department
 Bendersville Borough Police Department
 Bensalem Township Police Department
 Bentleyville Police Department
 Berlin Borough Police Department
 Bern Township Police Department
 Bernville Police Department
 Berwick Police Department
 Bessemer Police Department
 Bethel Park Police Department
 Bethel Township Police Department
 Bethlehem Police Department
 Biglerville Police Department
 Birdsboro Police Department
 Birmingham Police Department
 Black Creek Township Police Department
 Blair Township Police Department
 Blairsville Police Department
 Blakely Police Department
 Blakely Borough Police Department
 Blossburg City Police Department 
 Bonneauville Police Department 
 Boswell Borough Police Department
 Boyertown Police Department
 Braddock Borough Police Department
 Braddock Hills Police Department
 Bradford Police Department
 Brecknock Borough Police Department
 Brentwood Borough Police Department
 Briar Creek Township Police Department
 Bridgeport Township Police Department
 Brighton Township Police Department
 Bristol Borough Police Department
 Bristol Township Police Department
 Brockway Borough Police Department
 Brookhaven Borough Police Department
 Brookville Borough Police Department
 Brownsville Police Department
 Buckingham Township Police
 Buffalo Township Police Department
 Buffalo Valley Regional Police Department
 Butler Police Department
 Caernarvon Township Police
 California Police Department
 Cambria Township Police Department
 Camp Hill Police Department
 Canonsburg Police Department
 Carbondale Police Department
 Carbondale Township Police Department
 Carlisle Police Department
 Carnegie Police Department
 Carroll Township Police Department
 Cass Township Police Department
 Castle Shannon Police Department
 Catasauqua Police Department
 Catawissa Borough Police Department
 Cecil Township Police Department
 Center Township Police Department
 Centerville Police Department 
 Chalfont Borough Police Department
 Chambersburg Police Department
 Charleroi Regional Police Department
 Chartiers Township Police Department
 Cheltenham Township Police Department
 Chester Township Police Department
 Chippewa Township Police Department
 Churchill Township Police Department
 Clariton Police Department
 Clarks Summit Police Department
 Clearfield Borough Police Department
 Clifford Heights Police Department
 Clymer Police Department
 Coal Township Police Department
 Coaldale Police Department
 Coatesville Police Department
 Cochranton Police Department
 Colebrookdale District Police
 Collegeville Police Department
 Collier Police Department
 Collingdale Borough Police Department
 Columbia Police Department
 Colwyn Police Department
 Conewago Township Police Department
 Confluence Police Department
 Conneaut Lake Regional Police Department
 Conellsville Police Department
 Conshohocken Borough Police Department
 Conway Borough Police Department
 Conyngham Police Department 
 Coopersburg Police Department
 Coplay Borough Police Department 
 Coraopolis Police Department
 Cornwall Police Department
 Corry Police Department
 Coudersport Borough Police Department
 Courtdale Borough Police Department 
 Covington Township Police Department
 Crafton Police Department
 Cranberry Township Police Department
 Crescent Township Police Department
 Cresson Borough Police Department 
 Cressona Police Department 
 Cumberland Police Department
 Cumru Township Police
 Curwensville Borough Police Department
 Dallas Borough Police Department
 Dallas Township Police Department
 Dalton Borough Police Department 
 Danville Police Department
 Darby Borough Police Department
 Darlington Township Police Department
 Decatur Township Police Department
 Deer Lake Police Department 
 Delaware Water Gap Police Department 
 Derry Borough Police Department
 Derry Township Police
 Dickson City Borough Police Department
 Dormont Borough Police Department
 Douglass Township Police Department
 Downingtown Police Department
 DuBois City Police Department
 Dublin Borough Police Department
 Duncansville Police Department
 Dunmore Police Department
 Dupont Borough Police Department
 Earl Township Police Department
 East Bangor Police Department
 East Berlin Police Department
 East Brady Police Department 
 East Brandywine Township Police Department
 East Fallowfield Police Department
 East Franklin Township Police Department 
 East Hempfield Township Police Department 
 East McKeesport Borough Police Department 
 East Norriton Township Police Department 
 East Pennsboro Township Police Department 
 East Pikeland Police Department 
 East Stroudsburg Police Department 
 Easttown Police Department 
 East Union Township Police Department 
 East Vincent Township Police Department 
 East Washington Police Department 
 East Whiteland Township Police Department 
 Easton Police Department 
 Ebensburg Police Department 
 Economy Borough Police Department
 Eddystone Borough Police Department
 Edgewood Police Department
 Edinboro Police Department
 Edwardsville Borough Police Department
 Elderton Borough Police Department
 Elizabeth Police Department
 Elizabethtown Police Department
 Elkland Police Department 
 Elk Lick Police Department
 Ellwood City Police Department
 Emlenton Borough Police Department
 Emmaus City Police Department
 Ephrata Borough Police Department
 Erie Police Department
 Everett Police Department 
 Exeter Township Police
 Factoryville Police Department 
 Fairview Police Department
 Falls Township Police Department
 Fawn Township Police Department
 Ferguson Township Police Department
 Ferndale Borough Police Department 
 Folcroft Police Department
 Ford City Police Department
 Forest City Police Department
 Forest Lake Police Department
 Forks Township Police Department
 Fort Indiantown Gap Township Police Department
 Forty Fort Borough Police Department 
 Fountain Hill Borough Police Department
 Frackville Borough Police Department 
 Franklin City Police Department 
 Franklin Township Police Department
 Freeland Borough Police Department
 Freemansburg Police Department 
 Freeport Borough Police Department 
 Gaines Police Department
 Galeton Police Department 
 Gallitzin Police Department
 Geistown Borough Police Department
 Gettysburg Borough Police Department 
 Girard Police Department  
 Glassport Police Department  
 Glenolden Borough Police Department 
 Gloucester Township Police Department
 Gordon Borough Police Department  
 Greencastle Police Department 
 Greensburg Police Department 
 Greenfield Township Police Department 
 Greenville Police Department
 Halifax Police Department
 Hampton Township Police Department
 Hanover Borough Police Department
 Harding Police Department 
 Harmony Police Department
 Harrisburg Bureau of Police
 Harrison Township Police Department
 Harrisville Police Department
 Hartleton Police Department
 Hatboro Police Department
 Hatfield Township Police Department
 Haverford Township Police Department
 Hawley Borough Police Department
 Hazleton City Police Department
 Hegins Township Police Department
 Heidelberg Borough Police Department
 Hellam Township Police Department
 Hellertown Police Department
 Hempfield Township Police Department
 Hermitage Police Department
 Hickory Township Police Department 
 Highspire Borough Police Department
 Hilltown Township Police Department
 Hollidaysburg Borough Police Department
 Homer City Police Department
 Homestead Borough Police Department
 Honesdale Police Department
 Hopewell Township Police Department
 Horsham Township Police Department
 Hughestown Borough Police Department
 Hummelstown Borough Police Department
 Huntingdon Borough Police Department
 Independence Township Police Department
 Indiana Township Police Department
 Industry Borough Police Department 
 Ingram Borough Police Department
 Irwin Borough Police Department
 Jackson Township Police Department
 Jamestown Police Department
 Jeannette Police Department
 Jefferson Hills Police Department
 Jenkintown Police Department
 Jessup Police Department
 Jim Thorpe Police Department
 Johnsonburg Borough Police Department
 Kennedy Township Police Department
 Kennett Square Police Department (Pennsylvania)
 Kidder Township Police Department
 Kingston Police Department
 Kiskiminetas Township Police Department 
 Kline Township Police Department
 Knox Borough Police Department
 Knoxville Borough Police Department
 Koppel Police Department 
 Kulpmont Borough Police Department
 Kutztown Borough Police Department
 Lacyville Police Department
 Laflin Borough Police Department
 Lamar Township Police Department 
 Lancaster City Bureau of Police
 Langhorne Police Department
 Lansdale Borough Police Department
 Lansdowne Borough Police Department
 Lansford Police Department
 Larksville Borough Police Department
 Latrobe Police Department
 Laureldale Borough Police
 Lawrence Park Township Police Department
 Lawrence Township Police Department
 Lawrenceville Police Department
 Lebanon Police Department
 Leechburg Police Department
 Leesport Police Department 
 Leet Township Police Department
 Lehigh Township Police Department
 Lehighton Borough Police Department
 Limerick Township Police Department
 Linesville Police Department
 Lititz Borough Police Department
 Littlestown Police Department
 Lock Haven Police Department
 Logan Township Police Department
 Lower Allen Township Police Department
 Lower Burrell Police Department
 Lower Chichester Township Police Department
 Lower Gwynedd Township Police Department
 Lower Heidelberg Township Police
 Lower Makefield Township Police Department
 Lower Merion Police Department
 Lower Moreland Township Police Department
 Lower Paxton Police Department
 Lower Providence Township Police Department
 Lower Saucon Township Police Department
 Lower Southampton Township Police Department
 Lower Swatara Township Police Department
 Lower Windsor Township Police Department
 Luzerne Borough Police Department 
 Lykens Borough Police Department
 Macungie Police Department
 Mahanoy Police Department
 Mahoning Township Police Department
 Malvern Police Department
 Manheim Borough Police Department
 Manor Borough Police Department
 Manor Township Police Department
 Mansfield Police Department
 Marcus Hook Borough Police Department
 Marlborough Township Police Department
 Marple Township Police Department
 Mars Borough Police Department
 Martinsburg Borough Police Department
 Marysville Police Department
 Masontown Police Department
 Mayfield Police Department
 McCandless Police Department
 McDonald Police Department
 McKeesport Police Department
 McKees Rocks Police Department
 McSherrystown Police Department
 Mechanicsburg Police Department
 Media Borough Police Department
 Mercersburg Police Department
 Meshoppen Borough Police Department
 Meyersdale Borough Police Department
 Middlesex Police Department 
 Middletown Borough Police Department
 Midland Borough Police Department
 Milford Borough Police Department
 Millbourne Borough Police Department
 Mill Creek Police Department
 Millersville Borough Police Department
 Mill Hall Borough Police Department
 Millvale Borough Police Department
 Minersville Police Department
 Milton Police Department
 Mohnton Police Department 
 Monessen Police Department
 Monongahela Police Department
 Monroeville Police Department
 Montgomery Borough Police Department
 Montgomery Township Police Department
 Montoursville Borough Police Department
 Montrose Borough Police Department
 Moon Township Police Department
 Moosic Borough Police Department
 Morrisville Borough Police Department
 Morton Borough Police Department
 Moscow Borough Police Department
 Mount Carmel Borough Police Department
 Mount Holly Springs Police Department 
 Mount Joy Police Department
 Mount Lebanon Police Department
 Mount Oliver Police Department
 Mount Pleasant Police Department
 Mount Union Borough Police Department
 Muhlenberg Township Police Department
 Muncy Police Department 
 Murrysville Police Department
 Myerstown Borough Police Department 
 Nanticoke City Police Department
 Nanty Glo Police Department (Pennsylvania)
 Narberth Borough Police Department
 Nescopeck Borough Police Department
 Neshannock Township Police Department
 Nesquehoning Police Department
 Nether Providence Police Department
 New Berlin Police Department
 New Bethlehem Police Department
 New Bloomfield Police Department 
 New Britain Borough Police Department
 New Britain Township Police Department
 New Castle Police Department
 New Cumberland Police Department
 New Holland Borough Police Department
 New Hope Borough Police Department
 New Kensington Police Department
 New Wilmington Police Department
 Newberry Township Police Department
 Newport Township Police Department
 Newton Township Police Department
 Newtown Borough Police Department
 Newtown Township Police Department
 Newville Borough Police Department
 Norristown Police Department
 North Belle Vernon Police Department 
 North Braddock Police Department
 North Catasauqua Police Department
 North Cornwall Township Police Department
 North Coventry Township Police Department
 North East Police Department
 North Fayette Township Police Department
 North Hampton Borough Police Department
 North Hampton Township Police Department
 North Huntingdon Township Police Department
 North Lebanon Police Department
 North Londonderry Police Department
 North Middleton Township Police Department
 North Sewickley Township Police Department
 North Strabane Township Police Department
 North Versailles Township Police Department  
 North Wales Borough Police Department
 North Woodbury Township Police Department
 Oakdale Borough Police Department
 Ohio Township Police Department
 Ohioville Police Department
 Oil City Police Department
 Old Forge Borough Police Department
 Old Lycoming Police Department
 Oley Police Department
 Olyphant Police Department
 Orangeville Borough Police Department 
 Orwigsburg Borough Police Department 
 Pen Argyl Borough Police Department 
 Penbrook Borough Police Department 
 Penn Hills Police Department
 Pennsauken Township Police Department
 Penns Grove Police Department
 Penn Township Police Department
 Perkasie Borough Police Department 
 Peters Township Police Department
 Philadelphia Police Department 
 Phoenixville Police Department 
 Philipsburg Borough Police Department  
 Pine Creek Township Police Department
 Pine-Marshall-Bradfordwoods Joint Police Department
 Pitcairn Police Department
 Pittsburgh Bureau of Police
 Pittston City Police Department
 Pittston Township Police Department 
 Plain Grove Police Department 
 Plains Township Police Department 
 Plumstead Township Police Department
 Plymouth Borough Police Department
 Plymouth Township Police Department 
 Point Township Police Department 
 Port Allegany Police Department
 Port Carbon Police Department
 Pottstown Police Department
 Pottsville Bureau of Police
 Pringle Police Department 
 Prospect Park Police Department
 Pulaski Township Police Department
 Punxsutawney Police Department
 Quakertown Borough Police Department
 Quarryville Borough Police Department
 Raccoon Township Police Department 
 Radnor Township Police Department
 Ralpho Township Police Department
 Reading Police Department 
 Red Lion Police Department 
 Renovo Police Department
 Richland Township Police Department 
 Ridgway Police Department 
 Ridley Park Borough Police Department 
 Ridley Township Police Department 
 Rimersburg Police Department 
 Riverside Borough Police Department 
 Roaring Brook Township Police Department 
 Robinson Township Police Department 
 Rochester Borough Police Department
 Rockwood Police Department 
 Roseto Police Department
 Ross Township Police Department
 Rostraver Township Police Department
 Royersford Police Department 
 Rush Township Police Department
 Sadsbury Township Police Department
 Saint Clair Police Department
 Saint Marys City Police Department
 Salem Police Department 
 Salisbury Township Police Department
 Sandy Township Police Department 
 Saxonburg Borough Police Department 
 Saxton Borough Police Department 
 Sayre Borough Police Department 
 Schuylkill Haven Police Department 
 Schuylkill Township Police Department 
 Scott Township Police Department 
 Scottdale Borough Police Department
 Scranton Police Department
 Selinsgrove Borough Police Department 
 Sewickley Borough Police Department 
 Sewickley Heights Borough Police Department 
 Shaler Township Police Department
 Shamokin City Police Department
 Shamokin Dam Police Department
 Sharon Police Department
 Sharon Hill Police Department
 Sharpsburg Police Department
 Shenandoah Borough Police Department 
 Shenango Township Police Department 
 Shillington Police Department
 Shippensburg Police Department
 Shiremanstown Borough Police Department
 Shoemakersville Police Department
 Shohola Township Police Department
 Silver Lake Township Police Department
 Sinking Spring Borough Police 
 Slippery Rock Police Department 
 Smethport Police Department
 Smith Township Police Department
 Smithfield Borough Police Department 
 Solebury Police Department
 Somerset Borough Police Department
 Souderton Borough Police Department
 South Abington Township Police Department
 South Buffalo Township Police Department 
 South Fayette Police Department 
 South Heidelberg Township Police Department
 South Heights Police Department 
 South Lebanon Township Police Department
 South Londonderry Township Police Department
 South Strabane Township Police Department
 South Waverly Police Department
 South Whitehall Township Police Department 
 South Williamsport Police Department 
 Spring City Police Department
 Spring Garden Police Department 
 Springdale Borough Police Department 
 Springettsbury Township Police Department
 Springfield Township Police Department 
 State College Police Department 
 Steelton Borough Police Department 
 Stowe Township Police Department 
 Sugarcreek Borough Police Department
 Sugar Notch Borough Police Department
 Summit Hill Police Department
 Sunbury Police Department
 Susquehanna Township Police Department
 Swatara Township Police Department 
 Swarthmore Police Department
 Sweden Township Police Department
 Swissvale Borough Police Department
 Swoyersville Borough Police Department
 Sykesville Police Department
 Tamaqua Borough Police Department
 Tarentum Police Department
 Taylor Borough Police Department 
 Throop Police Department 
 Tidioute Borough Police Department
 Tilden Township Police 
 Tinicum Township Police Department
 Titusville Police Department 
 Towamencin Township Police Department
 Towanda Borough Police Department 
 Township of Spring Police Department 
 Trafford Police Department 
 Tredyffrin Township Police Department 
 Troy Borough Police Department 
 Tullytown Borough Police Department
 Tulehocken Township Police Department 
 Tunkhannock Borough Police Department 
 Turtle Creek Borough Police Department 
 Tyrone Borough Police Department
 Union City Police Department
 Union Township Police Department
 Uniontown Police Department
 Upland Borough Police Department
 Upper Allen Police Department
 Upper Burrell Township Police Department 
 Upper Chichester Police Department 
 Upper Darby Township Police Department
 Upper Dublin Township Police Department
 Upper Gwynedd Police Department
 Upper Macungie Township Police Department
 Upper Makefield Township Police Department 
 Upper Merion Township Police Department
 Upper Moreland Township Police Department
 Upper Pottsgrove Police Department
 Upper Providence Township Police Department
 Upper Saint Clair Police Department
 Upper Saucon Township Police Department
 Upper Southampton Township Police Department
 Upper Uwchlan Township Police Department
 Upper Yoder Township Police Department
 Uwchlan Township Police Department
 Valley Township Police Department
 Vandergrift Police Department
 Vernon Township Police Department
 Verona Police Department
 Walnutport Borough Police Department
 Wampum Borough Police Department
 Warminster Township Police Department
 Warren City Police Department
 Warrington Township Police Department
 Washington Township Police Department
 Watsontown Borough Police Department
 Waynesboro Police Department
 Weatherly Police Department
 Wellsboro Police Department
 Wesleyville Police Department
 West Chester Police Department
 West Conshohocken Borough Police Department
 West Deer Township Police Department
 Westfield Borough Police Department
 West Goshen Township Police Department
 West Grove Police Department
 West Hazleton Police Department
 West Hempfield Township Police Department
 West Homestead Police Department
 West Lampeter Township Police Department
 West Mahanoy Township Police Department 
 West Manchester Township Police Department
 West Manheim Township Police Department
 West Mead Police Department
 West Mifflin Police Department
 West Newton Police Department 
 West Penn Township Police Department 
 West Pittston Police Department
 West Reading Police Department
 West Whiteland Township Police Department
 West Wyoming Police Department
 West York Borough Police Department
 Whitehall Township Bureau of Police
 Whitemarsh Township Police Department
 Wilkes-Barre City Police Department
 Wilkes-Barre Township Police Department
 Williamsburg Police Department
 Williamsport Police Department
 Williamstown Borough Police Department 
 Wilson Borough Police Department
 Windber Borough Police Department
 Worthington Borough Police Department
 Wright Township Police Department
 Wrightsville Borough Police Department
 Wyoming Borough Police Department
 Wyomissing Borough Police Department
 Yardley Borough Police Department 
 Yatesville Borough Police Department 
 Yeadon Borough Police Department 
 York City Police Department 
 Zelienople Borough Police Department 
 Zerbe Township Police Department

Regional police agencies 
 Allegheny Valley Regional Police Department (Allegheny County)
 Buffalo Valley Regional Police Department
 Central Berks Regional Police Department 
 Central Bucks Regional Police Department
 Charleroi Regional Police Department 
 Colonial Regional Police Department
 Eastern Adams Regional Police Department
 Eastern Pike Regional Police
 Evans City-Seven Fields Regional Police Department
 Greene County Regional Police Department
 Mifflin County Regional Police Department
 Morris-Cooper Regional Police Department 
 Northern York County Regional Police Department
 Northern Berks Regional Police Department
 Northern Regional Police Department (Allegheny County)
 Northern York County Regional Police Department
 Northwest Regional Police Department
 Pennridge Regional Police
 Pocono Mountain Regional Police Department
 R.E.S.A. Regional Police Department
 Evans City/Seven Fields Regional Police Department (Butler County)
 Slate Belt Regional Police Department
 South Center/Mifflin Police Department
 Southern Regional Police Department
 Southern Chester County Regional Police Department
 Southwest Greensburg Borough Police Department
 Southwest Regional Police Department 
 Stroud Area Regional Police Department
 Susquehanna Regional Police Department
 Tiadaghton Valley Regional Police Department
 Upper Perk Police District
 Western Berks Regional Police Department
 West Hills Regional Police Department
 West Shore Regional Police Department
 Westtown East Goshen Regional Police Department
 York Area Regional Police Department

College and University agencies 
 Albright College Department of Public Safety
 Arcadia University Department of Public Safety
 Bloomsburg University Police Department
 Bucknell University Public Safety
 Carlow University Police Department
 Carnegie Mellon University Police Department
 Cedar Crest College Police Department
 Chatham University Public Safety Department
 Dickinson College Department of Public Safety
 Drexel University Police Department
 Duquesne University Department of Public Safety
 East Stroudsburg University Police Department
 Franklin and Marshall University Department of Public Safety
 Harrisburg Area Community College Department of Public Safety
 Indiana University of Pennsylvania Office of Public Safety
 Juniata College Public Safety Office
 Kutztown University Police Department
 Lackawanna College Public Safety Department
 Lincoln University Police Department
 Lock Haven University Police Department
 Mansfield University Police Department
 Millersville University Police Department
 Pennsylvania College of Technology Police Department
 Penn State University Police Department
 University of Pittsburgh Police Department
 Point Park University Department of Public Safety
 Robert Morris University Public Safety Department
 University of Scranton Police Department
 Saint Francis University Police Department
 Shippensburg University Police Department 
 Slippery Rock University Police Department
 Temple University Department of Campus Safety Services
 University of Pennsylvania Police Department
 West Chester University Department of Public Safety
 York College of Pennsylvania Department of Campus Safety

Other agencies 
Note: This includes Federal Agencies that operate in PA, as well as state, local & private agencies.

Allegheny County Housing Authority Police Department
Allegheny County Port Authority Police Department
Amtrak Police Department
 Bethel Park School District Police Department
 Central Dauphin School District Police Department 
 Delaware River Port Authority Police Department
 Department of the Army Civilian Police Department (Tobyhanna Army Depot)
 Department of the Army Civilian Police Department (Carlisle Barracks)
 Gateway School District Police Department
 Pennsylvania Department of Emergency Management and Military Affairs Police (Fort Indiantown Gap)
 Nazareth Area School District Police Department
 Office of the United States Marshal for the Eastern District of Pennsylvania
 Office of the United States Marshal for the Middle District of Pennsylvania
 Office of the United States Marshal for the Western District of Pennsylvania
 Pennsylvania SPCA Police (Philadelphia)
 Philadelphia Housing Authority Police Department
 Pittsburgh Public Schools Department of School Safety (School Police)
 Reading and Northern Railroad Police
 School District Of The City Of York Police Department
 SEPTA Transit Police
 Spring-Ford Area School District School Police Department
 U.S. Department of Veterans Affairs Police
 United States Mint Police
 U.S. Probation and Pretrial Services System
 UPMC Children's Hospital of Pittsburgh Public Safety Department

Disbanded agencies 
 Albion Borough Police Department 
 Aleppo Township Police Department (Successor Agency - Ohio Township Police Department)
 Allentown Fairgrounds Police Department
 Bath Borough Police Department
 Bechtelsville Borough Police Department (Successor Agency - Colebrookdale District Police Department)
 Belle Vernon Borough Police Department (Successor Agency - Southwest Regional Police Department)
 Ben Avon Borough Police Department (Successor Agency - Ohio Township Police Department)
 Berks-Lehigh Regional Police
 Boyertown Borough Police Department (Successor Agency - Eastern Berks Regional Police Department)
 Brandywine Regional Police 
 Burgettstown Borough Police Department (Successor Agency - McDonald Borough Police Department)
 Chalfant Borough Police (Allegheny County)
 Chalfont Borough Police Department  (Bucks County) (Successor Agency - Central Bucks County Regional Police Department)
 Cheswick Borough Police Department (Successor Agency - Allegheny Valley Regional Police Department)
 Clifford Township Police Department 
Coal and Iron Police
 Colebrookdale District Police Department (Successor Agency - Eastern Berks Regional Police Department)
 Connoquenessing Borough Police Department 
 Coolbaugh Township Police Department 
Chester-Upland School District Police Department 
 Dale Borough Police Department (Successor Agency - City of Johnstown Police Department)
 Dravosburg Police Department (Successor Agency - McKeesport City Police Department 
 East Bethlehem Township Police Department (Washington County) (Successor Agency - Centerville Borough Police Department)
 East Pittsburgh Police Department
 Ellsworth/Cokeburg Boroughs (Ell-Co) Police Department
 Emsworth Borough Police Department (Successor Agency - Ohio Township Police Department)
 Evans City Borough Police Department (Successor Agency - Evans City/Seven Fields Regional Police Department
 Fairchance Borough Police Department 
 Fallowfield Township Police Department 
 Forward Township Police Department (Allegheny County) (Successor Agency - Elizabeth Township Police Department contracted through 2026) 
 Industry Borough Police Department (Successor Agency - Beaver Borough Police Department contracted through 2023)
 Kennywood Park Police name changed to Kennywood Public Safety
 Kilbuck Township Police Department (Successor Agency - Ohio Township Police Department)
 Leesport Borough Police Department (Successor Agency - Northern Berks Regional Police Department)
 Ligonier Borough Police Department (Successor Agency - Ligonier Valley Police Department)
 Ligonier Township Police Department (Successor Agency - Ligonier Valley Police Department)l 
 Long Branch Borough Police Department (Washington County)
 Lower Yoder Township Police Department (Cambria County) (Successor Agency - West Hills Regional Police Department)
 Maidencreek Township Police Department (Successor Agency - Maidencreek Ontelaunee Joint Police Commission)
 Maidencreek Ontelaunee Joint Police Commission (Successor Agency - Northern Berks Regional Police Department)
 Midway Borough Police Department (Successor Agency - McDonald Borough Police Department)
 Morris Township Police Department (Greene County) (Successor Agency - Greene County Regional Police Department)
 Mount Pocono Borough Police Department 
 Myerstown Borough Police Department 
 Neville Township Police Department (Successor Agency - Ohio Township Police Department)
 New Eagle Borough Police Department (Successor Agency - City of Monongahela Police Department)
 New Florence Borough Police Department (Successor Agency - St. Clair Township Police Department)
 New Garden Police Department
 North Charleroi Borough Police Department (Successor Agency - Charleroi Regional Police Department)
 North Franklin Township Police Department 
 North Irwin Borough Police Department (Successor Agency - Irwin Borough Police Department) 
 Ohiopyle Borough Police Department 
 Oley Township Police Department (Successor Agency - Central Berks Regional Police Department)
 Ontelaunee Township Police Department (Successor Agency - Northern Berks Regional Police Department) 
 Paint Borough Police Department (Successor Agency - Windber Borough Police Department) 
 Paint Township Police Department (Somerset County)
 Penn Township Police Department (Perry County)
 Pike Township Police Department (Berks County)
 Pine Township Police Department (Allegheny County) (Successor Agency - Pine-Marshall-Bradford Woods Police Department)
 Pine-Marshall-Bradford Woods Police Department (Successor Agency - Northern Regional Police Department)
 Point Marion Police Department
 Presque Isle State Park Police Department (Successor Agency - Pennsylvania Department of Conservation and Natural Resources)
 Richland Township Police Department (Allegheny County) (Successor Agency - Northern Regional Police Department)
 Rosslyn Farms Borough Police Department (Successor Agency - Scott Township Police Department)
 Seven Fields Borough Police Department (Successor Agency - Evans City/Seven Fields Regional Police Department
 Seven Springs Borough Police Department 
 Seward Borough Police Department (Successor Agency - St. Clair Township Police Department)
 Shade Township Police Department 
 State Police of Crawford and Erie Counties
 South Versailles Township Police Department (Successor Agency - White Oak Borough Police Department)
 Springdale Township Police Department (Allegheny County) (Successor Agency - Allegheny Valley Regional Police Department)
 Thornburg Borough Police Department 
 Thornbury Police Department
 Tobyhanna Township Police Department 
 Tunkhannock Township Police Department 
 Union Township Police Department (Washington County) (Successor Agency
City of Monongahela Police Department)
 Vanderbilt Borough Police Department 
 Vanport Township Police Department (Successor Agency - Beaver Borough Police Department contracted through 2024)
 West Elizabeth Borough Police Department (Successor Agency - Elizabeth Borough Police Department)
 West Grove Police Department* New Garden Police Department
 West Taylor Township Police Department (Successor Agency - City of Johnstown Police Department)
 Wharton Township Police Department (Fayette County)
 Wilmerding Borough Police Department (Successor Agency - Pitcairn Police Department)
 Youngwood Borough Police Department

References

Lists of United States law enforcement agencies by state
Law enforcement agencies of Pennsylvania
Law enforcement agencies